Bruce Lee (born Lee Jun-fan, ; November 27, 1940 – July 20, 1973) was a Hong Kong and American actor, director, martial artist, martial arts instructor and philosopher. He was the founder of Jeet Kune Do, a hybrid martial arts philosophy drawing from different combat disciplines that is often credited with paving the way for modern mixed martial arts (MMA). Lee is considered by critics, media, and other martial artists to be the most influential martial artist of all time and a pop culture icon of the 20th century, who bridged the gap between East and West. He is credited with promoting Hong Kong action cinema and helping to change the way Asians were presented in American films.

Born in San Francisco and raised in British Hong Kong, Lee was introduced to the Hong Kong film industry as a child actor by his father. However, these were not martial arts films. His early martial arts experience included Wing Chun (trained under Yip Man), tai chi, boxing (winning a Hong Kong boxing tournament), and apparently frequent street fighting (neighbourhood and rooftop fights). In 1959, Lee, having U.S. citizenship due to his birth, was able to move to Seattle. In 1961, he enrolled in the University of Washington. It was during this time in the United States that he began considering making money by teaching martial arts, even though he aspired to have a career in acting. He opened his first martial arts school, operated out of home in Seattle. After later adding a second school in Oakland, California, he once drew significant attention at the 1964 Long Beach International Karate Championships of California by making demonstrations and speaking. He subsequently moved to Los Angeles to teach, where his students included Chuck Norris, Sharon Tate, and Kareem Abdul-Jabbar. In the 1970s, his Hong Kong and Hollywood-produced films elevated the Hong Kong martial arts films to a new level of popularity and acclaim, sparking a surge of Western interest in Chinese martial arts. The direction and tone of his films dramatically influenced and changed martial arts and martial arts films worldwide.

He is noted for his roles in five feature-length Hong Kong martial arts films in the early 1970s: Lo Wei's The Big Boss (1971) and Fist of Fury (1972); Golden Harvest's The Way of the Dragon (1972), directed and written by Lee; and Golden Harvest and Warner Brothers' Enter the Dragon (1973) and The Game of Death (1978), both directed by Robert Clouse. Lee became an iconic figure known throughout the world, particularly among the Chinese, based upon his portrayal of Chinese nationalism in his films, and among Asian Americans for defying Asian stereotypes. Having initially learnt Wing Chun, tai chi, boxing, and street fighting, he combined them with other influences from various sources into the spirit of his personal martial arts philosophy, which he dubbed Jeet Kune Do (The Way of the Intercepting Fist).

Lee died on July 20, 1973, at age 32. Since his death, Lee has continued to be a prominent influence on modern combat sports, including judo, karate, mixed martial arts, and boxing, as well as modern popular culture, including film, television, comics, animation, and video games. Time named Lee one of the 100 most important people of the 20th century.

Early life 

Bruce Lee's father Lee Hoi-chuen was a famous Cantonese opera singer based in Hong Kong. In December 1939, his parents went to Chinatown, San Francisco in California for an international opera tour. He was born there on November 27, 1940, making him a dual Hong Kong and United States citizen by birth. At four months old (April 1941), the Lee family returned to Hong Kong. Soon after, the Lee family experienced unexpected hardships over the next four years as Japan, in the midst of World War II, launched a surprise attack on Hong Kong in December 1941 and ruled the city for the next four years.

Bruce's father, Lee Hoi-chuen, was Cantonese, and his mother, Grace Ho, was of Eurasian ancestry. Lee's maternal grandfather was Cantonese, his maternal grandmother was English and his maternal great-uncle, Robert Hotung, was a successful Hong Kong businessman of Dutch Jewish and Cantonese descent.

Career and education

1940–1958: Early roles, schooling and martial arts initiation 
Lee's father Lee Hoi-chuen was a famous Cantonese opera star. As a result, the junior Lee was introduced to the world of cinema at a very young age and appeared in several films as a child. Lee had his first role as a baby who was carried onto the stage in the film Golden Gate Girl. He took his Chinese stage name as 李小龍, lit. Lee the Little Dragon, for the fact that he was born in both the hour and the year of the Dragon by the Chinese zodiac.

As a nine-year-old, he co-starred with his father in The Kid in 1950, which was based on a comic book character and was his first leading role. By the time he was 18, he had appeared in 20 films. After attending Tak Sun School (several blocks from his home at 218 Nathan Road, Kowloon), Lee entered the primary school division of the Catholic La Salle College at age 12.

In 1956, due to poor academic performance and possibly poor conduct, he was transferred to St. Francis Xavier's College, where he was mentored by Brother Edward Muss, F.M.S., a Bavarian-born teacher and coach of the school boxing team. After Lee was involved in several street fights, his parents decided that he needed to be trained in the martial arts.

In 1953, Lee's friend William Cheung introduced him to Ip Man, but he was rejected from learning Wing Chun Kung Fu under him because of the long-standing rule in the Chinese martial arts world not to teach foreigners.

His one quarter European background from his mother's side was an initial obstacle towards his Wing Chun training. Cheung spoke on his behalf and Lee was accepted into the school. Lee began training in Wing Chun with Yip Man. Yip tried to keep his students from fighting in the street gangs of Hong Kong by encouraging them to fight in organised competitions.

After a year into his Wing Chun training, most of Yip Man's other students refused to train with Lee when they had learned of his mixed ancestry, as the Chinese were generally against teaching their martial arts techniques to non-Asians. Lee's sparring partner, Hawkins Cheung, states, "Probably fewer than six people in the whole Wing Chun clan were personally taught, or even partly taught, by Yip Man". However, Lee showed a keen interest in Wing Chun and continued to train privately with Yip Man, William Cheung, and Wong Shun-leung.

In 1958, Bruce won the Hong Kong schools boxing tournament, knocking out the previous champion, Gary Elms, in the final. That year, Lee was also a cha-cha dancer, winning Hong Kong's Crown Colony Cha-Cha Championship.

1959–1964: Continuous studies and martial arts breakthrough 
Until his late teens, Lee's street fights became more frequent and included beating the son of a feared triad family. In 1958, after students from a rival Choy Li Fut martial arts school challenged Lee's Wing Chun school, he engaged in a fight on a rooftop. In response to an unfair punch by another boy, Bruce beat him so badly that he knocked out one of his teeth, leading to a complaint by the boy's parents to the police.

Lee's mother had to go to a police station and sign a document saying that she would take full responsibility for Bruce's actions if they released him into her custody. Though she did not mention the incident to her husband, she suggested that Bruce, being an American citizen, return to the United States. Lee's father agreed, as Lee's college prospects were not very promising, if he remained in Hong Kong .

In April 1959, Lee's parents decided to send him to the United States to stay with his older sister, Agnes Lee, who was already living with family friends in San Francisco. After several months, he moved to Seattle in 1959 to continue his high school education, where he also worked for Ruby Chow as a live-in waiter at her restaurant. Chow's husband was a co-worker and friend of Lee's father. Lee's elder brother Peter Lee joined him in Seattle for a short stay, before moving on to Minnesota to attend college.

In 1959 Lee started to teach martial arts. He called what he taught Jun Fan Gung Fu (literally Bruce Lee's Kung Fu). It was basically his approach to Wing Chun. Lee taught friends he met in Seattle, starting with Judo practitioner Jesse Glover, who continued to teach some of Lee's early techniques. Taky Kimura became Lee's first Assistant Instructor and continued to teach his art and philosophy after Lee's death. Lee opened his first martial arts school, named the Lee Jun Fan Gung Fu Institute, in Seattle.

Lee completed his high school education and received his diploma from Edison Technical School on Capitol Hill in Seattle.

In March 1961, Lee enrolled at the University of Washington and studied dramatic arts, philosophy, psychology, and various other subjects. Despite what Lee himself and many others have stated, Lee's official major was drama rather than philosophy, according to a 1999 article in the university's alumni publication.

Lee dropped out of college in early 1964 and moved to Oakland to live with James Yimm Lee. James Lee was twenty years senior to Bruce Lee and a well-known Chinese martial artist in the area. Together, they founded the second Jun Fan martial arts studio in Oakland. James Lee was responsible for introducing Bruce Lee to Ed Parker, an American martial artist. At the invitation of Parker, Lee appeared in the 1964 Long Beach International Karate Championships and performed repetitions of two-finger push-ups, using the thumb and the index finger of one hand, with feet at approximately shoulder-width apart.

In the same Long Beach event he also performed the "one inch punch". Lee stood upright, his right foot forward with knees bent slightly, in front of a standing, stationary partner. Without retracting his right arm, Lee then forcibly delivered the punch to volunteer Bob Baker while largely maintaining his posture. This sent Baker backwards and falling into a chair placed behind Baker to prevent injury, though Baker's momentum caused him to fall to the floor. Baker recalled, "I told Bruce not to do this type of demonstration again. When he punched me that last time, I had to stay home from work because the pain in my chest was unbearable". It was at the 1964 championships that Lee first met Taekwondo master Jhoon Goo Rhee. The two developed a friendship—a relationship from which they benefited as martial artists. Rhee taught Lee the side kick in detail, and Lee taught Rhee the "non-telegraphic" punch.

In Oakland's Chinatown in 1964, Lee had a controversial private match with Wong Jack-man, a direct student of Ma Kin Fung, known for his mastery of Xingyiquan, Northern Shaolin, and T'ai chi ch'uan. According to Lee, the Chinese community issued an ultimatum to him to stop teaching non-Chinese people. When he refused to comply, he was challenged to a combat match with Wong. The arrangement was that if Lee lost, he would have to shut down his school, while if he won, he would be free to teach white people, or anyone else.

Wong denied this, stating that he requested to fight Lee after Lee boasted during one of his demonstrations at a Chinatown theatre that he could beat anyone in San Francisco, and that Wong himself did not discriminate against Whites or other non-Chinese people. Lee commented, "That paper had all the names of the sifu from Chinatown, but they don't scare me". Individuals known to have witnessed the match include Cadwell, James Lee (Bruce Lee's associate, no relation), and William Chen, a teacher of T'ai chi ch'uan.

Wong and William Chen stated that the fight lasted an unusually long 20–25 minutes. Wong claims that although he had originally expected a serious but polite bout, Lee aggressively attacked him with intent to kill. When Wong presented the traditional handshake, Lee appeared to accept the greeting, but instead, Lee allegedly thrust his hand as a spear aimed at Wong's eyes. Forced to defend his life, Wong asserted that he refrained from striking Lee with killing force when the opportunity presented itself because it could have earned him a prison sentence, but used illegal cufflings under his sleeves. According to Michael Dorgan's 1980 book Bruce Lee's Toughest Fight, the fight ended due to Lee's "unusually winded" condition, as opposed to a decisive blow by either fighter.

However, according to Bruce Lee, Linda Lee Cadwell, and James Yimm Lee, the fight lasted a mere three minutes with a decisive victory for Lee. In Cadwell's account, "The fight ensued, it was a no-holds-barred fight, it took three minutes. Bruce got this guy down to the ground and said 'Do you give up?' and the man said he gave up". A couple of weeks after the bout, Lee gave an interview claiming that he had defeated an unnamed challenger, which Wong says was an obvious reference to him.

In response, Wong published his own account of the fight in the Chinese Pacific Weekly, a Chinese-language newspaper in San Francisco, with an invitation to a public rematch if Lee was not satisfied with the account. Lee did not respond to the invitation despite his reputation for violently responding to every provocation. There were no further public announcements by either, though Lee continued to teach white people. Lee had abandoned thoughts of a film career in favour of pursuing martial arts. However, a martial arts exhibition on Long Beach in 1964 eventually led to the invitation by television producer William Dozier for an audition for a role in the pilot for "Number One Son" about Lee Chan, the son of Charlie Chan. The show never materialised, but Dozier saw potential in Lee.

1966–1970: American roles and creating Jeet Kune Do 

From 1966 to 1967, Lee played the role of Kato alongside the title character played by Van Williams in the TV series produced and narrated by William Dozier titled The Green Hornet, based on the radio show by the same name. The show ran for one season (26 episodes) from September 1966 to March 1967. Lee and Williams also appeared as their characters in three crossover episodes of Batman, another William Dozier-produced television series.

The Green Hornet introduced the adult Bruce Lee to an American audience, and became the first popular American show presenting Asian-style martial arts. The show's director wanted Lee to fight in the typical American style using fists and punches. As a professional martial artist, Lee refused, insisting that he should fight in the style of his expertise. At first, Lee moved so fast that his movements could not be caught on film, so he had to slow them down.

During the show's production, Lee became friends with Gene LeBell, who worked as a stuntman in the show. The two trained together and exchange martial knowledge from their respective specialties. After the show was cancelled in 1967, Lee wrote to Dozier thanking him for starting "my career in show business".

In 1967, Lee played a role in one episode of Ironside.

Jeet Kune Do originated in 1967. After filming one season of The Green Hornet, Lee found himself out of work and opened The Jun Fan Gung Fu Institute. The controversial match with Wong Jack-man influenced Lee's philosophy about martial arts. Lee concluded that the fight had lasted too long and that he had failed to live up to his potential using his Wing Chun techniques. He took the view that traditional martial arts techniques were too rigid and formalised to be practical in scenarios of chaotic street fighting. Lee decided to develop a system with an emphasis on "practicality, flexibility, speed, and efficiency". He started to use different methods of training such as weight training for strength, running for endurance, stretching for flexibility, and many others which he constantly adapted, including fencing and basic boxing techniques.

Lee emphasised what he called "the style of no style". This consisted of getting rid of the formalised approach which Lee claimed was indicative of traditional styles. Lee felt that even the system he now called Jun Fan Gung Fu was too restrictive, and it eventually evolved into a philosophy and martial art he would come to call Jeet Kune Do or the Way of the Intercepting Fist. It is a term he would later regret, because Jeet Kune Do implied specific parameters that styles connote, whereas the idea of his martial art was to exist outside of parameters and limitations.

At the time, two of Lee's martial arts students were Hollywood script writer Stirling Silliphant and actor James Coburn. In 1969, the three worked on a script for a film called The Silent Flute, and went together on a location hunt to India. The project was not realised at the time, but the 1978 film Circle of Iron, starring David Carradine, was based on the same plot. In 2010, producer Paul Maslansky was reported to have planned and received funding for a film based on the original script for The Silent Flute.

In 1969, Lee made a brief appearance in the Silliphant-penned film Marlowe, where he played a hoodlum hired to intimidate private detective Philip Marlowe, played by James Garner, who uses his martial arts abilities to commit acts of vandalisation to intimidate Marlowe. The same year, he was credited as the karate advisor in The Wrecking Crew, the fourth instalment of the Matt Helm comedy spy-fi film starring Dean Martin. Also that year, Lee acted in one episode of Here Come the Brides and Blondie.

In 1970, he was responsible for fight choreography for A Walk in the Spring Rain starring Ingrid Bergman and Anthony Quinn, again written by Silliphant.

1971–1973: Hong Kong films and Hollywood breakthrough 
In 1971, Lee appeared in four episodes of the television series Longstreet, written by Silliphant. Lee played Li Tsung, the martial arts instructor of the title character Mike Longstreet, played by James Franciscus, and important aspects of his martial arts philosophy were written into the script. According to statements made by Lee, and also by Linda Lee Cadwell after Lee's death, in 1971 Lee pitched a television series of his own, tentatively titled The Warrior, discussions of which were confirmed by Warner Bros. During a December 9, 1971, television interview on The Pierre Berton Show, Lee stated that both Paramount and Warner Brothers wanted him "to be in a modernized type of a thing, and that they think the Western idea is out, whereas I want to do the Western".

According to Cadwell, Lee's concept was retooled and renamed Kung Fu, but Warner Bros. gave Lee no credit. Warner Brothers states that they had for some time been developing an identical concept, created by two writers and producers, Ed Spielman and Howard Friedlander in 1969, as stated too by Lee's biographer Matthew Polly. According to these sources, the reason Lee was not cast was because he had a thick accent, but Fred Weintraub attributes that to his ethnicity.

The role of the Shaolin monk in the Wild West was eventually awarded to then-non-martial-artist David Carradine. In The Pierre Berton Show interview, Lee stated he understood Warner Brothers' attitudes towards casting in the series: "They think that business-wise it is a risk. I don't blame them. If the situation were reversed, and an American star were to come to Hong Kong, and I was the man with the money, I would have my own concerns as to whether the acceptance would be there".

Producer Fred Weintraub had advised Lee to return to Hong Kong and make a feature film which he could showcase to executives in Hollywood. Not happy with his supporting roles in the US, Lee returned to Hong Kong. Unaware that The Green Hornet had been played to success in Hong Kong and was unofficially referred to as "The Kato Show", he was surprised to be recognised as the star of the show. After negotiating with both Shaw Brothers Studio and Golden Harvest, Lee signed a film contract to star in two films produced by Golden Harvest.

Lee played his first leading role in The Big Boss (1971), which proved to be an enormous box office success across Asia and catapulted him to stardom. He followed up with Fist of Fury (1972), which broke the box office records set previously by The Big Boss. Having finished his initial two-year contract, Lee negotiated a new deal with Golden Harvest. Lee later formed his own company, Concord Production Inc., with Chow. For his third film, The Way of the Dragon (1972), he was given complete control of the film's production as the writer, director, star, and choreographer of the fight scenes. In 1964, at a demonstration in Long Beach, California, Lee met karate champion Chuck Norris. In The Way of the Dragon Lee introduced Norris to moviegoers as his opponent. Their showdown has been characterised as "one of the best fight scenes in martial arts and film history". The role had originally been offered to American karate champion Joe Lewis. Fist of Fury and Way of the Dragon grossed an estimated  and  worldwide, respectively.

From August to October 1972, Lee began work on his fourth Golden Harvest film, Game of Death. He began filming some scenes, including his fight sequence with  American basketball star Kareem Abdul-Jabbar, a former student. Production stopped in November 1972 when Warner Brothers offered Lee the opportunity to star in Enter the Dragon, the first film to be produced jointly by Concord, Golden Harvest, and Warner Bros. Filming began in Hong Kong in February 1973 and was completed in April 1973.

One month into the filming, another production company, Starseas Motion Pictures, promoted Bruce Lee as a leading actor in Fist of Unicorn, although he had merely agreed to choreograph the fight sequences in the film as a favour to his long-time friend Unicorn Chan. Lee planned to sue the production company, but retained his friendship with Chan. However, only a few months after the completion of Enter the Dragon, and six days before its July 26, 1973, release, Lee died.

Enter the Dragon went on to become one of the year's highest-grossing films and cemented Lee as a martial arts legend. It was made for US$850,000 in 1973, the equivalent to $4 million adjusted for inflation as of 2007. Enter the Dragon is estimated to have grossed over  worldwide, the equivalent of over  adjusted for inflation . The film sparked a brief fad in martial arts, epitomised in songs such as "Kung Fu Fighting" and some TV shows.

1978–present: Posthumous work 
Robert Clouse, the director of Enter the Dragon, together with Golden Harvest, revived Lee's unfinished film Game of Death. Lee had shot over 100 minutes of footage, including out-takes, for Game of Death before shooting was stopped to allow him to work on Enter the Dragon. In addition to Abdul-Jabbar, George Lazenby, Hapkido master Ji Han-Jae, and another of Lee's students, Dan Inosanto, appeared in the film, which culminated in Lee's character, Hai Tien, clad in the now-famous yellow track suit taking on a series of different challengers on each floor as they make their way through a five-level pagoda.

In a controversial move, Robert Clouse finished the film using a look-alike and archive footage of Lee from his other films with a new storyline and cast, which was released in 1978. However, the cobbled-together film contained only fifteen minutes of actual footage of Lee (he had printed many unsuccessful takes) while the rest had a Lee look-alike, Kim Tai Chung, and Yuen Biao as stunt double. The unused footage Lee had filmed was recovered 22 years later and included in the documentary Bruce Lee: A Warrior's Journey.

Apart from Game of Death, other future film projects were planned to feature Lee at the time. In 1972, after the success of The Big Boss and Fist of Fury, a third film was planned by Raymond Chow at Golden Harvest to be directed by Lo Wei, titled Yellow-Faced Tiger. However, at the time, Lee decided to direct and produce his own script for Way of the Dragon instead. Although Lee had formed a production company with Raymond Chow, a period film was also planned from September–November 1973 with the competing Shaw Brothers Studio, to be directed by either Chor Yuen or Cheng Kang, and written by Yi Kang and Chang Cheh, titled The Seven Sons of the Jade Dragon.

In 2015, Perfect Storm Entertainment and Bruce Lee's daughter, Shannon Lee, announced that the series The Warrior would be produced and would air on the Cinemax. Filmmaker Justin Lin was chosen to direct the series. Production began in October 2017, in Cape Town, South Africa. The first season will contain 10 episodes. In April 2019, Cinemax renewed the series for a second season.

In March 2021, it was announced that producer Jason Kothari had acquired the rights to The Silent Flute "to become a miniseries, which would have John Fusco as a screenwriter and executive producer.

Unproduced works 
Lee had also worked on several scripts himself. A tape containing a recording of Lee narrating the basic storyline to a film tentatively titled Southern Fist/Northern Leg exists, showing some similarities with the canned script for The Silent Flute (Circle of Iron). Another script had the title Green Bamboo Warrior, set in San Francisco, planned to co-star Bolo Yeung and to be produced by Andrew Vajna. Photoshoot costume tests were organised for some of these planned film projects.

Martial arts and fitness

Striking 
Lee's first introduction to martial arts was through his father, from whom he learned the fundamentals of Wu-style t'ai chi ch'uan. In his teens, Lee became involved in Hong Kong gang conflicts, which led to frequent street fights. The largest influence on Lee's martial arts development was his study of Wing Chun. Lee was 16 years old under the Wing Chun teacher Yip Man, between late 1956 and 1957, after losing to rival gang members.

Yip's regular classes generally consisted of the forms practice, chi sao (sticking hands) drills, wooden dummy techniques, and free sparring. There was no set pattern to the classes. Other Chinese martial arts styles Lee trained in were Northern Praying Mantis, Southern Praying Mantis, Eagle Claw, Tan Tui, Law Hon, Mizongyi, Wa K'ung, Monkey, Southern Dragon, Fujian White Crane, Choy Li Fut, Hung Gar, Choy Gar, Fut Gar, Mok Gar, Yau Kung Moon, Li Gar, and Lau Gar.

Lee was trained in boxing, between 1956 and 1958, by Brother Edward, coach of the St. Francis Xavier's College boxing team. Lee went on to win the Hong Kong schools boxing tournament in 1958, while scoring knockdowns against the previous champion Gary Elms in the final. After moving to the United States, Lee was heavily influenced by heavyweight boxing champion Muhammad Ali, whose footwork he studied and incorporated into his own style in the 1960s.

Lee demonstrated his Jeet Kune Do martial arts at the Long Beach International Karate Championships in 1964 and 1968, with the latter having higher-quality video footage available. Lee is seen demonstrating quick eye strikes before his opponent can block, and demonstrating the one-inch punch on several volunteers. He demonstrates chi sao drills while blindfolded against an opponent, probing for weaknesses in his opponent while scoring with punches and takedowns. Lee then participates in a full-contact sparring bout against an opponent, with both wearing leather headgear.

Lee is seen implementing his Jeet Kune Do concept of economical motion, using Ali-inspired footwork to keep out of range while counter-attacking with backfists and straight punches. He halts attacks with stop-hit side kicks, and quickly executes several sweeps and head kicks. The opponent repeatedly attempts to attack Lee, but is never able to connect with a clean hit. He once manages to come close with a spin kick, but Lee counters it. The footage was reviewed by Black Belt magazine in 1995, concluding that "the action is as fast and furious as anything in Lee's films."

It was at the 1964 championships that Lee first met taekwondo master Jhoon Goo Rhee. While Rhee taught Lee the side kick in detail, Lee taught Rhee the "non-telegraphic" punch. Rhee learned what he calls the "accupunch" from Lee and incorporated it into American taekwondo. The "accupunch" is a rapid fast punch that is very difficult to block, based on human reaction time—"the idea is to finish the execution of the punch before the opponent can complete the brain-to-wrist communication."

Lee commonly used the oblique kick, made popular much later in mixed martial arts. It is called the jeet tek, "stop kick" or "intercepting kick", in Jeet Kune Do.

Grappling 
Lee favored cross-training between different fighting styles, and had a particular interest in grappling. Lee trained with several judo practitioners in Seattle and California, among them Fred Sato, Jesse Glover, Taky Kimura, Hayward Nishioka and Wally Jay, as well as Gene LeBell. Many of his first students were proficient in judo and other arts, and he learned as much as he taught. After befriending LeBell on the set of The Green Hornet, Lee offered to teach him striking arts in exchange for being taught grappling techniques. LeBell had been taught catch wrestling by prestigious grapplers Lou Thesz and Ed Lewis, and notable techniques of both judo and catch wrestling can be seen in Lee's Tao of Jeet Kune Do. He also learned grappling moves from hapkido master Ji Han-jae.

According to Glover, Lee only found judo ineffective at the action of getting hold of the opponent. In their first training together, Glover showed Lee an osoto gari, which Lee considered not a bad technique, but he disliked that Glover had needed to hold onto Lee. While in Seattle, Lee developed anti-grappling techniques against opponents trying to tackle him or take him to the ground. Glover recalled Lee "definitely would not go to the ground if he had the opportunity to get you standing up." Nonetheless, Lee expressed to LeBell a wish to integrate judo into his fighting style. He incorporated the osoto gari into Jeet Kune Do, among other throws, armlocks and chokeholds from judo.

Although Lee opined that grappling was of little use in action choreography because it was not visually distinctive, he showcased grappling moves in his own films, such as Way of the Dragon, where his character finishes his opponent Chuck Norris with a neck hold inspired by LeBell, and Enter the Dragon, whose prologue features Lee submitting his opponent Sammo Hung with an armbar. Game of Death also features Lee and Han-jae exchanging grappling moves, as well as Lee using wrestling against the character played by Kareem Abdul-Jabbar.

Lee was also influenced by the training routine of The Great Gama, an Indian/Pakistani pehlwani wrestling champion known for his grappling strength. Lee incorporated Gama's exercises into his own training routine.

Street fighting 
Another major influence on Lee was Hong Kong's street fighting culture in the form of rooftop fights. In the mid-20th century, soaring crime in Hong Kong, combined with limited Hong Kong Police manpower, led to many young Hongkongers learning martial arts for self-defence. Around the 1960s, there were about 400 martial arts schools in Hong Kong, teaching their own distinctive styles of martial arts. In Hong Kong's street fighting culture, there emerged a rooftop fight scene in the 1950s and 1960s, where gangs from rival martial arts schools challenged each other to bare-knuckle fights on Hong Kong's rooftops, in order to avoid crackdowns by British colonial authorities. Lee frequently participated in these Hong Kong rooftop fights. He combined different techniques from different martial arts schools into his own hybrid martial arts style.

When Lee returned to Hong Kong in the early 1970s, his reputation as "the fastest fist in the east" routinely led to locals challenging him to street fights. He sometimes accepted these challenges and engaged in street fights, which led to some criticism from the press portraying him as violent at the time.

Fitness 
At  and weighing  at the time, Lee was renowned for his physical fitness and vigor, achieved by using a dedicated fitness regimen to become as strong as possible. After his match with Wong Jack-man in 1965, Lee changed his approach toward martial arts training. Lee felt that many martial artists of his time did not spend enough time on physical conditioning. Lee included all elements of total fitness—muscular strength, muscular endurance, cardiovascular endurance, and flexibility. He used traditional bodybuilding techniques to build some muscle mass, though not overdone, as that could decrease speed or flexibility. At the same time, with respect to balance, Lee maintained that mental and spiritual preparation are fundamental to the success of physical training in martial arts skills. In Tao of Jeet Kune Do he wrote:

According to Linda Lee Cadwell, soon after he moved to the United States, Lee started to take nutrition seriously and developed an interest in health foods, high-protein drinks, and vitamin and mineral supplements. He later concluded that achieving a high-performance body was akin to maintaining the engine of a high-performance automobile. Allegorically, as one could not keep a car running on low-octane fuels, one could not sustain one's body with a steady diet of junk food, and with "the wrong fuel", one's body would perform sluggishly or sloppily.

Lee avoided baked goods and refined flour, describing them as providing empty calories that did nothing for his body. He was known for being a fan of Asian cuisine for its variety, and often ate meals with a combination of vegetables, rice, and fish. Lee had a dislike for dairy products and as a result, used powdered milk in his diet.

Dan Inosanto recalls Lee practiced meditation as the first action on his schedule.

Artistry

Philosophy 
While best known as a martial artist, Lee studied drama and Asian and Western philosophy, starting while a student at the University of Washington. He was well-read and had an extensive library dominated by martial arts subjects and philosophical texts. His own books on martial arts and fighting philosophy are known for their philosophical assertions, both inside and outside of martial arts circles. His eclectic philosophy often mirrored his fighting beliefs, though he was quick to claim that his martial arts were solely a metaphor for such teachings.

He believed that any knowledge ultimately led to self-knowledge. He said that his chosen method of self-expression was martial arts. His influences include Taoism, Jiddu Krishnamurti, and Buddhism. Lee's philosophy was very much in opposition to the conservative worldview advocated by Confucianism. John Little states that Lee was an atheist. When asked in 1972 about his religious affiliation, he replied, "none whatsoever". When asked if he believed in God, he said, "To be perfectly frank, I really do not."

Poetry 
Aside from martial arts and philosophy, which focus on the physical aspect and self-consciousness for truths and principles, Lee also wrote poetry that reflected his emotion and a stage in his life collectively. Many forms of art remain concordant with the artist creating them. Lee's principle of self-expression was applied to his poetry as well. His daughter Shannon Lee said, "He did write poetry; he was really the consummate artist."

His poetic works were originally handwritten on paper, then later on edited and published, with John Little being the major author (editor), for Bruce Lee's works. Linda Lee Cadwell (Bruce Lee's wife) shared her husband's notes, poems, and experiences with followers. She mentioned "Lee's poems are, by American standards, rather dark—reflecting the deeper, less exposed recesses of the human psyche".

Most of Bruce Lee's poems are categorised as anti-poetry or fall into a paradox. The mood in his poems shows the side of the man that can be compared with other poets such as Robert Frost, one of many well-known poets expressing himself with dark poetic works. The paradox taken from the Yin and Yang symbol in martial arts was also integrated into his poetry. His martial arts and philosophy contribute a great part to his poetry. The free verse form of Lee's poetry reflects his famous quote "Be formless ... shapeless, like water."

Personal life

Names 
Lee's Cantonese birth name was Lee Jun-fan. The name homophonically means "return again", and was given to Lee by his mother, who felt he would return to the United States once he came of age. Because of his mother's superstitious nature, she had originally named him Sai-fon, which is a feminine name meaning "small phoenix". The English name "Bruce" is thought to have been given by the hospital attending physician, Dr. Mary Glover.

Lee had three other Chinese names: Lee Yuen-cham, a family/clan name; Lee Yuen-kam, which he used as a student name while he was attending La Salle College, and his Chinese screen name Lee Siu-lung (Siu-lung means "little dragon"). Hence, the Chinese character for Jun in Lee's name was changed to the homonym  instead, to avoid naming taboo in Chinese tradition.

Family 

Lee's father, Lee Hoi-chuen, was one of the leading Cantonese opera and film actors at the time and was embarking on a year-long opera tour with his family on the eve of the Japanese invasion of Hong Kong. Lee Hoi-chuen had been touring the United States for many years and performing in numerous Chinese communities there.

Although many of his peers decided to stay in the US, Lee Hoi-chuen returned to Hong Kong after Bruce's birth. Within months, Hong Kong was invaded and the Lees lived for three years and eight months under Japanese occupation. After the war ended, Lee Hoi-chuen resumed his acting career and became a more popular actor during Hong Kong's rebuilding years.

Lee's mother, Grace Ho, was from one of the wealthiest and most powerful clans in Hong Kong, the Ho-tungs. She was the half-niece of Sir Robert Ho-tung, the Eurasian patriarch of the clan. As such, the young Bruce Lee grew up in an affluent and privileged environment. Despite the advantage of his family's status, the neighbourhood in which Lee grew up became overcrowded, dangerous, and full of gang rivalries due to an influx of refugees fleeing communist China for Hong Kong, at that time a British Crown Colony.

Grace Ho is reported as either the adopted or biological daughter of Ho Kom-tong (Ho Gumtong) and the half-niece of Sir Robert Ho-tung, both notable Hong Kong businessmen and philanthropists. Bruce was the fourth of five children: Phoebe Lee, Agnes Lee, Peter Lee, and Robert Lee.

Grace's parentage remains unclear. Linda Lee, in her 1989 biography The Bruce Lee Story, suggests that Grace had a German father and was a Catholic. Bruce Thomas, in his influential 1994 biography Bruce Lee: Fighting Spirit, suggests that Grace had a Chinese mother and a German father. Lee's relative Eric Peter Ho, in his 2010 book Tracing My Children's Lineage, suggests that Grace was born in Shanghai to a Eurasian woman named Cheung King-sin. Eric Peter Ho said that Grace Lee was the daughter of a mixed race Shanghainese woman and her father was Ho Kom Tong. Grace Lee said her mother was English and her father was Chinese. Fredda Dudley Balling said Grace Lee was three-quarters Chinese and one-quarter British.

In the 2018 biography Bruce Lee: A Life, Matthew Polly identifies Lee's maternal grandfather as Ho Kom-tong, who had often been reported as his adoptive grandfather. Ho Kom-tong's father, Charles Maurice Bosman, was a Dutch Jewish businessman from Rotterdam. He moved to Hong Kong with the Dutch East India Company and served as the Dutch consul to Hong Kong at one time. He had a Chinese concubine named Sze Tai with whom he had six children, including Ho Kom Tong. Bosman subsequently abandoned his family and immigrated to California. Ho Kom Tong became a wealthy businessman with a wife, 13 concubines, and a British mistress who gave birth to Grace Ho.

His younger brother Robert Lee Jun-fai is a notable musician and singer, his group The Thunderbirds were famous in Hong Kong. A few singles were sung mostly or all in English. Also released was Lee singing a duet with Irene Ryder. Lee Jun-fai lived with Lee in Los Angeles in the United States and stayed. After Lee's death, Lee Jun-fai released an album and the single by the same name dedicated to Lee called The Ballad of Bruce Lee.

While studying at the University of Washington he met his future wife Linda Emery, a fellow student studying to become a teacher. As relations between people of different races was still banned in many US states, they married in secret in August 1964. Lee had two children with Linda: Brandon (1965–1993) and Shannon Lee (born 1969). Upon's Lee passing in 1973, she continued to promote Bruce Lee's martial art Jeet Kune Do. She wrote the 1975 book Bruce Lee: The Man Only I Knew, on which the 1993 feature film Dragon: The Bruce Lee Story was based. In 1989, she wrote the book The Bruce Lee Story. She retired in 2001 from the family estate.

Lee died when his son Brandon was eight years old. While alive, Lee taught Brandon martial arts and would invite him to visit sets. This gave Brandon the desire to act and went on to study the craft. As a young adult, Brandon Lee found some success acting in action-oriented pictures such as Legacy of Rage (1986), Showdown in Little Tokyo (1991), and Rapid Fire (1992). In 1993, at the age of 28, Brandon Lee died after being accidentally shot by a prop gun on the set of The Crow.

Lee died when his daughter Shannon was four. In her youth she studied Jeet Kune Do under Richard Bustillo, one of her father's students; however, her serious studies did not begin until the late 1990s. To train for parts in action movies, she studied Jeet Kune Do with Ted Wong.

Friends, students, and contemporaries 
Lee's brother Robert with his friends Taky Kimura, Dan Inosanto, Steve McQueen, James Coburn, and Peter Chin were his pallbearers. Coburn was a martial arts student and a friend of Lee. Coburn worked with Lee and Stirling Silliphant on developing The Silent Flute. Upon Lee's early death, at his funeral Coburn gave a eulogy. Regarding McQueen, Lee made no secret that he wanted everything McQueen had and would stop at nothing to get it. Inosanto and Kimura were friends and disciple of Lee. Inosanto who would go on to train Lee's son Brandon. Kimura continued to teach Lee's craft in Seattle. According to Lee's wife, Chin was a lifelong family friend and a student of Lee.

James Yimm Lee (no relation) was one of Lee's three personally certified 3rd rank instructors and co-founded the Jun Fan Gung Fu Institute in Oakland where he taught Jun Fan Gung Fu in Lee's absence. James was responsible for introducing Lee to Ed Parker, the organiser of the Long Beach International Karate Championships, where Lee was first introduced to the martial arts community. Hollywood couple Roman Polanski and Sharon Tate studied martial arts with Lee. Polanski flew Lee to Switzerland to train him. Tate studied with Lee in preparation for her role in The Wrecking Crew. After Tate was murdered by the Manson Family, Polanski initially suspected Lee.

Screenwriter Stirling Silliphant was a martial arts student and a friend of Lee. Silliphant worked with Lee and James Coburn on developing The Silent Flute. Lee acted and provided his martial arts expertise in several projects penned by Silliphant, the first in Marlowe (1969) where Lee plays Winslow Wong a hoodlum well versed in martial arts. Lee also did fight choreographies for the film A Walk in the Spring Rain (1970), and played Li Tsung, a Jeet Kune Do instructor who teaches the main character in the television show Longstreet (1971). Elements of his martial arts philosophy were included in the script for the latter.

Basketball player Kareem Abdul-Jabbar studied martial arts and developed a friendship with Lee.

Actor and karate champion Chuck Norris was a friend and training partner of Lee's. After Lee's passing, Norris said he kept in touch with Lee's family.

Judoka and professional wrestler Gene LeBell became a friend of Lee on the set of The Green Hornet. They trained together and exchanged their knowledge of martial arts.

Death 

On May 10, 1973, Lee collapsed during an automated dialogue replacement session for Enter the Dragon at Golden Harvest film studio in Hong Kong. Because he was having seizures and headaches, he was immediately rushed to Hong Kong Baptist Hospital, where doctors diagnosed cerebral edema. They were able to reduce the swelling through the administration of mannitol. The headache and cerebral edema that occurred in his first collapse were later repeated on the day of his death.

On Friday, July 20, 1973, Lee was in Hong Kong to have dinner with actor George Lazenby, with whom he intended to make a film. According to Lee's wife Linda, Lee met producer Raymond Chow at 2 p.m. at home to discuss the making of the film Game of Death. They worked until 4 p.m. and then drove together to the home of Lee's colleague Betty Ting Pei, a Taiwanese actress. The three went over the script at Ting's home, and then Chow left to attend a dinner meeting.

Later, Lee complained of a headache, and Ting gave him the painkiller Equagesic, which contained both aspirin and the tranquiliser meprobamate. Around 7:30 p.m., he went to lie down for a nap. When Lee did not come for dinner, Chow came to the apartment, but he was unable to wake Lee up. A doctor was summoned, and spent ten minutes attempting to revive Lee before sending him by ambulance to Queen Elizabeth Hospital. Lee was declared dead on arrival at the age of 32.

There was no visible external injury; however, according to autopsy reports, Lee's brain had swollen considerably, from 1,400 to 1,575 grams (a 13% increase). The autopsy found Equagesic in his system. On October 15, 2005, Chow stated in an interview that Lee died from an allergic reaction to the tranquiliser meprobamate, the main ingredient in Equagesic, which Chow described as an ingredient commonly used in painkillers. When the doctors announced Lee's death, it was officially ruled a "death by misadventure".

Lee's wife Linda returned to her hometown of Seattle, and had Lee's body buried in Lake View Cemetery in Seattle. Pallbearers at Lee's funeral on July 25, 1973, included Taky Kimura, Steve McQueen, James Coburn, Dan Inosanto, Peter Chin, and Lee's brother Robert. Around the time of Lee's death, numerous rumours appeared in the media. Lee's iconic status and untimely death fed many wild rumours and theories. These included murder involving the triads and a supposed curse on him and his family.

Donald Teare, a forensic scientist, recommended by Scotland Yard, who had overseen over 1,000 autopsies, was assigned to the Lee case. His conclusion was "death by misadventure" caused by cerebral edema due to a reaction to compounds present in the combination medication Equagesic. Although there was initial speculation that cannabis found in Lee's stomach may have contributed to his death, Teare said it would "be both 'irresponsible and irrational' to say that [cannabis] might have triggered either the events of Bruce's collapse on May 10 or his death on July 20". Dr. R. R. Lycette, the clinical pathologist at Queen Elizabeth Hospital, reported at the coroner hearing that the death could not have been caused by cannabis.

In a 2018 biography, author Matthew Polly consulted with medical experts and theorised that the cerebral edema that killed Lee had been caused by over-exertion and heat stroke; heat stroke was not considered at the time because it was then a poorly understood condition. Furthermore, Lee had his underarm sweat glands removed in late 1972, in the apparent belief that underarm sweat was unphotogenic on film. Polly further theorised that this caused Lee's body to overheat while practising in hot temperatures on May 10 and July 20, 1973, resulting in heat stroke that in turn exacerbated the cerebral edema that led to his death.

In an article in the December 2022 issue of Clinical Kidney Journal, a team of researchers examined the various theories regarding Lee's cause of death, and concluded that his fatal cerebal edema was brought on by hyponatremia, an insufficient concentration of sodium in the blood.  The authors noted that there were several risk factors which predisposed Lee to hyponatremia, including excessive water intake, insufficient solute intake, alcohol consumption, and use or overuse of multiple drugs which impair the ability of the kidneys to excrete excess fluids.  Lee's symptoms prior to his death were also found to closely match known cases of fatal hyponatremia.

Legacy and cultural impact 

Lee is considered by commentators, critics, media, and other martial artists to be the most influential martial artist of all time, and a pop culture icon of the 20th century, who bridged the gap between East and West. Time named Lee one of the 100 most important people of the 20th century.

A number of biography books have been written about Bruce Lee. A biography about Lee sold more than  copies by 1988.

Action films 

Lee was largely responsible for launching the "kung fu craze" of the 1970s. He initially introduced kung fu to the West with American television shows such as The Green Hornet and Kung Fu, before the "kung fu craze" began with the dominance of Hong Kong martial arts films in 1973. Lee's success inspired a wave of Western martial arts films and television shows throughout the 1970s–1990s (launching the careers of Western martial arts stars such as Jean-Claude Van Damme, Steven Seagal and Chuck Norris), as well as the more general integration of Asian martial arts into Western action films and television shows during the 1980s1990s.

Enter the Dragon has been cited as one of the most influential action films of all time. Sascha Matuszak of Vice said Enter the Dragon "is referenced in all manner of media, the plot line and characters continue to influence storytellers today, and the impact was particularly felt in the revolutionizing way the film portrayed African-Americans, Asians and traditional martial arts." Kuan-Hsing Chen and Beng Huat Chua cited fight scenes in Lee's films such as Enter the Dragon as being influential for the way they pitched "an elemental story of good against evil in such a spectacle-saturated way".

A number of action filmmakers around the world have cited Bruce Lee as a formative influence on their careers, including Hong Kong action film directors such as Jackie Chan and John Woo, and Hollywood filmmakers such as Quentin Tarantino and Brett Ratner.

Martial arts and combat sports 
Jeet Kune Do, a hybrid martial arts philosophy drawing from different combat disciplines that was founded by Lee, is often credited with paving the way for modern mixed martial arts (MMA). The concept of mixed martial arts was popularised in the West by Bruce Lee via his system of Jeet Kune Do. Lee believed that "the best fighter is not a Boxer, Karate or Judo man. The best fighter is someone who can adapt to any style, to be formless, to adopt an individual's own style and not following the system of styles."

In 2004, Ultimate Fighting Championship (UFC) founder Dana White called Lee the "father of mixed martial arts" and stated: "If you look at the way Bruce Lee trained, the way he fought, and many of the things he wrote, he said the perfect style was no style. You take a little something from everything. You take the good things from every different discipline, use what works, and you throw the rest away".

Lee was largely responsible for many people taking up martial arts. These include numerous fighters in combat sports who were inspired by Lee; boxing champion Sugar Ray Leonard said he perfected his jab by watching Lee, boxing champion Manny Pacquiao compared his fighting style to Lee, and UFC champion Conor McGregor has compared himself to Lee and said that he believes Lee would have been a champion in the UFC if he were to compete in the present day.

Lee inspired the foundation of American full-contact kickboxing tournaments by Joe Lewis and Benny Urquidez in the 1970s. American taekwondo pioneer Jhoon Goo Rhee learned from Lee what he calls the "accupunch", which he incorporated into American taekwondo. Rhee later coached heavyweight boxing champion Muhammad Ali and taught him the "accupunch", which Ali used to knockout Richard Dunn in 1975. According to heavyweight boxing champion Mike Tyson, "everyone wanted to be Bruce Lee" in the 1970s.

UFC pound-for-pound champion Jon Jones cited Lee as inspiration, with Jones known for frequently using the oblique kick to the knee, a technique that was popularised by Lee. UFC champions Uriah Hall and Anderson Silva cited Lee as an inspiration. Numerous other UFC fighters have cited Lee as their inspiration, with several referring to him as a "godfather" or "grandfather" of MMA.

Racial barriers and stereotypes 
Lee is credited with helping to change the way Asians were presented in American films. He defied Asian stereotypes, such as the emasculated Asian male stereotype. In contrast to earlier stereotypes which depicted Asian men as emasculated, childlike, coolies, or domestic servants, Lee demonstrated that Asian men could be "tough, strong and sexy" according to University of Michigan lecturer Hye Seung Chung. In turn, Lee's popularity inspired a new Asian stereotype, the martial artist.

In North America, his films initially played largely to black, Asian and Hispanic audiences. Within black communities, Lee's popularity was second only to heavyweight boxer Muhammad Ali in the 1970s. As Lee broke through to the mainstream, he became a rare non-white movie star in a Hollywood industry dominated by white actors at the time. According to rapper LL Cool J, Lee's films were the first time many non-white American children such as himself had seen a non-white action hero on the big screen in the 1970s.

Popular culture 
Numerous entertainment and sports figures around the world have cited Lee as a major influence on their work, including martial arts actors such as Jackie Chan and Donnie Yen, actor-bodybuilder Arnold Schwarzenegger, actor-comedians such as Eddie Murphy and Eddie Griffin, actresses such as Olivia Munn and Dianne Doan, musicians such as Steve Aoki and Rohan Marley, rappers such as LL Cool J and Wu-Tang Clan leader RZA, music bands such as the Gorillaz, comedians such as W. Kamau Bell and Margaret Cho, basketball players Stephen Curry and Jamal Murray, skaters Tony Hawk and Christian Hosoi, and American footballer Kyler Murray, among others.

Bruce Lee influenced several comic book writers, notably Marvel Comics founder Stan Lee, who considered Bruce Lee to be a superhero without a costume. Shortly after his death, Lee inspired the Marvel characters Shang-Chi (debuted 1973) and Iron Fist (debuted 1974) as well as the comic book series The Deadly Hands of Kung Fu (debuted 1974). According to Stan Lee, any character that is a martial artist since then owes their origin to Bruce Lee in some form.

Bruce Lee was a formative influence on the development of breakdancing in the 1970s. Early breakdancing pioneers such as the Rock Steady Crew drew inspiration from kung fu moves, as performed by Lee, inspiring dance moves such as the windmill among other breaking moves.

In India, Lee films had an influence on Hindi masala films. After the success of Lee films such as Enter the Dragon in India, Deewaar (1975) and later Hindi films incorporated fight scenes inspired by 1970s Hong Kong martial arts films up until the 1990s. According to Indian film star Aamir Khan, when he was a child, "almost every house had a poster of Bruce Lee" in 1970s Bombay.

In Japan, the manga and anime franchises Fist of the North Star (1983–1988) and Dragon Ball (1984–1995) were inspired by Lee films such as Enter the Dragon. In turn, Fist of the North Star and especially Dragon Ball are credited with setting the trends for popular shōnen manga and anime from the 1980s onwards. Spike Spiegel, the protagonist from the 1998 anime Cowboy Bebop, is seen practising Jeet Kune Do and quotes Lee.

Bruce Lee films such as Game of Death and Enter the Dragon were the foundation for video game genres such as beat 'em up action games and fighting games. The first beat 'em up game, Kung-Fu Master (1984), was based on Lee's Game of Death. The Street Fighter video game franchise (1987 debut) was inspired by Enter the Dragon, with the gameplay centered around an international fighting tournament, and each character having a unique combination of ethnicity, nationality and fighting style; Street Fighter went on to set the template for all fighting games that followed. Since then, nearly every major fighting game franchise has had a character based on Bruce Lee. In April 2014, Lee was named a featured character in the combat sports video game EA Sports UFC, and is playable in multiple weight classes.

In France, the Yamakasi cited the martial arts philosophy of Bruce Lee as an influence on their development of the parkour discipline in the 1990s, along with the acrobatics of Jackie Chan. The Yamakasi considered Lee to be the "unofficial president" of their group.

The Legend of Bruce Lee (2008), a Chinese television drama series based on the life of Bruce Lee, has been watched by over  viewers in China, making it the most-watched Chinese television drama series of all time, as of 2017.

In November 2022, it was announced that Taiwanese filmmaker Ang Lee was directing a biopic on Bruce Lee. Ang Lee's son Mason Lee was cast to star in the movie, while Bruce Lee's daughter, Shannon Lee, is set to produce the film.

Commercials 
Though Bruce Lee did not appear in commercials during his lifetime, his likeness and image has since appeared in hundreds of commercials around the world. Nokia launched an Internet-based campaign in 2008 with staged "documentary-looking" footage of Bruce Lee playing ping-pong with his nunchaku and also igniting matches as they are thrown toward him. The videos went viral on YouTube, creating confusion as some people believed them to be authentic footage.

Honors

Awards 
 1972: Golden Horse Awards Best Mandarin Film
 1972: Fist of Fury Special Jury Award
 1994: Hong Kong Film Award for Lifetime Achievement
 1999: Named by Time as one of the 100 most influential people of the 20th century
 2004: Star of the Century Award
 2013: The Asian Awards Founders Award

Statues 
 Statue of Bruce Lee (Los Angeles): unveiled June 15, 2013, Chinatown Central Plaza, Los Angeles, California
 Statue of Bruce Lee (Hong Kong):  bronze statue of Lee was unveiled on November 27, 2005, on what would have been his 65th birthday.
 Statue of Bruce Lee (Mostar): The day before the Hong Kong statue was dedicated, the city of Mostar in Bosnia and Herzegovina unveiled its own  bronze statue; supporters of the statue cited Lee as a unifying symbol against the ethnic divisions in the country, which had culminated in the 1992–95 Bosnian War.

Places 
A theme park dedicated to Lee was built in Jun'an, Guangdong. Mainland Chinese only started watching Bruce Lee films in the 1980s, when videos of classic movies like The Chinese Connection became available.

On January 6, 2009, it was announced that Lee's Hong Kong home (41 Cumberland Road, Kowloon, Hong Kong) would be preserved and transformed into a tourist site by Yu Pang-lin. Yu died in 2015 and this plan did not materialise. In 2018, Yu's grandson, Pang Chi-ping, said: "We will convert the mansion into a centre for Chinese studies next year, which provides courses like Mandarin and Chinese music for children."

Filmography

Books 
 Chinese Gung-Fu: The Philosophical Art of Self Defense (Bruce Lee's first book) – 1963
 Tao of Jeet Kune Do (Published posthumously) – 1973
 Bruce Lee's Fighting Method (Published posthumously) – 1978

See also 
 Media about Bruce Lee
 Bruce Lee (comics)
 Bruce Lee Library
 Bruceploitation
 Dragon: The Bruce Lee Story
 List of stars on the Hollywood Walk of Fame – Bruce Lee at 6933 Hollywood Blvd
 The Legend of Bruce Lee

Citations

General bibliography

External links 

 Bruce Lee Foundation
 
 
 
 

 
1940 births
1973 deaths
20th-century American male actors
20th-century American male writers
20th-century American philosophers
20th-century American screenwriters
20th-century Hong Kong male actors
Accidental deaths in Hong Kong
American atheists
American born Hong Kong artists
American emigrants to Hong Kong
American expatriates in Hong Kong
American film actors of Asian descent
American film directors of Hong Kong descent
American film producers
American Jeet Kune Do practitioners
American male actors of Hong Kong descent
American male film actors
American male martial artists
American male non-fiction writers
American male screenwriters
American male television actors
American people of English descent
American people of German descent
American stunt performers
American Wing Chun practitioners
American writers of Chinese descent
American wushu practitioners
Burials in Washington (state)
Cantonese people
Chinese atheists
Chinese Jeet Kune Do practitioners
Death conspiracy theories
Deaths from cerebral edema
Film directors from San Francisco
Film producers from California
Green Hornet
Hong Kong film directors
Hong Kong film producers
Hong Kong kung fu practitioners
Hong Kong male child actors
Hong Kong male film actors
Hong Kong male television actors
Hong Kong martial artists
Hong Kong people of English descent
Hong Kong people of German descent
Hong Kong philosophers
Hong Kong screenwriters
Hong Kong stunt performers
Hong Kong wushu practitioners
Male actors from California
Male actors from San Francisco
Martial arts school founders
Neurological disease deaths in Hong Kong
People from Chinatown, San Francisco
Screenwriters from California
University of Washington alumni
Wing Chun practitioners from Hong Kong
Writers from San Francisco